See the World Given to a One Love Entity is the second album from Brooklyn, New York psychedelic rock band Guardian Alien. The album was released in the form of one 37-minute track.

Album cover
The cover art was done by Turner Williams Jr., who plays shahi baaja on the record. It is said to depict a dream that drummer Greg Fox had. Portions of the cover are reflected in a poem included in the albums packaging, in which he hands a copy of the album to God and finds out he is an alien.

Track listing

Critical reception

Upon its release, the album received generally positive reviews.

Personnel 
 Guardian Alien
 Greg Fox - Drums, Gong, Kargyraa, Arrangement, Field recordings, Editing
 Alex Drewchin Jr. - Vocals
 Turner Williams Jr. - Shahi baaja, Cover art
 Bernard Gann - Guitar
 Eli Winograd - Bass guitar, Recording
 Heba Kadry - Mastering
 Max Hodes - Recording

References 

2012 albums
Guardian Alien albums